Cavendish Rocks is a conspicuous bare rocks just south of Cavendish Icefalls in the middle of Taylor Glacier, in Victoria Land. Named by Advisory Committee on Antarctic Names (US-ACAN) in 1964 after Cavendish Icefalls.

Rock formations of Victoria Land
McMurdo Dry Valleys